Dr. Garnet Harvey Kearney, (1884–1971) was a Canadian medical doctor, teacher, and pioneer.

Born in Renfrew, Ontario, he received his Ph.D. in medicine from McGill University.
During World War I, Kearney served as a ship's medical doctor for various freighters and troop convoys. Later in the war, he became a front-line first-aid medic until the end of the war. He married Marjorie Van Volkingburgh in 1944, and she died in 1954.

Kearney arrived in Fort St. John, British Columbia in 1935, replacing a Dr. Brown, the first medical doctor in Fort St. John. He served as the town's only medical doctor for some time. He was an early advocate of government funded medical care, and he did not charge for his services if the patient could not afford them.

In 1939, Kearney operated on a man via radio. Twenty-one-year-old Gordon Stock, in Watson Lake, was suffering from delirium and urgently need brain surgery. Jack Baker, the man's employer, radioed Kearney asking for instructions. Kearney correctly diagnosed Stock as having a cyst on his brain, and informed Baker that surgery to relieve pressure was necessary immediately, as the man would die without it. The remote surgery was a success, and Stock made a full recovery.

A school in Fort St. John, Dr. Kearney Middle School (formerly Junior Secondary School), is named in his honour.

References
 

1884 births
1971 deaths
Physicians from British Columbia
McGill University Faculty of Medicine alumni
People from Renfrew County